The Chrysler-Plymouth Classic was a golf tournament on the LPGA Tour from 1976 to 1989. It was played at several courses, mostly in New Jersey.

Tournament locations

Winners

References

Former LPGA Tour events
Golf in New Jersey
Golf in New York (state)
Sports in New Rochelle, New York
Recurring sporting events established in 1976
Recurring sporting events disestablished in 1989
1976 establishments in New Jersey
1989 disestablishments in New Jersey
History of women in New Jersey